The Port Royal House is a historic house in Chatham, Massachusetts. The two-story wood-frame house was built in 1863 by Seth Eldredge, a ship's captain. The Italianate villa was reportedly based on a house in Port Royal, Jamaica seen by Captain Eldredge, who acquired its plans and had it copied. It has a low-pitch hip roof whose eave is decorated with paired brackets, the corners have paneled piasters, and a single-story porch extends across the front, supported by fluted columns mounted on paneled piers.

The house was listed on the National Register of Historic Places on April 15, 1982.

See also
National Register of Historic Places listings in Barnstable County, Massachusetts

References

Houses in Barnstable County, Massachusetts
National Register of Historic Places in Barnstable County, Massachusetts
Houses on the National Register of Historic Places in Barnstable County, Massachusetts
Houses completed in 1863